N-Methylspiperone (NMSP) is a derivate of spiperone that is used to study the dopamine and serotonin neurotransmitter systems.  Labeled with the radioisotope carbon-11, it can be used for positron emission tomography.

References 

Dopamine antagonists
Piperidines
Lactams
Fluoroarenes
Spiro compounds
Aromatic ketones